The Journal of Biomedical Science is a peer-reviewed medical journal that covers all aspects of basic medical sciences. It was established in 1994 and initially published by Springer Science+Business Media. Since 2009 it has been published by BioMed Central, after which it became open access. Originally the journal was published quarterly, before changing its frequency to bimonthly in 1996. The editor-in-chief is Wen-Chang Chang (Taipei Medical University).

The journal was the first international journal in biomedical science to be operated by a Taiwanese team.

Abstracting and indexing 
The journal is abstracted and indexed in:

According to the Journal Citation Reports, the journal has a 2020 impact factor of 8.410.

References

External links 
 

Publications established in 1994
BioMed Central academic journals
General medical journals
Creative Commons Attribution-licensed journals
English-language journals